Khwaja Baqi Billah, born as Muhammad Baqi (14 July 1564– 29 November 1603), was a Sufi saint from Kabul. He was disciple of Khawaja Muhammad Amkanagi.

Birth 
Baqi Billah was the originator and pioneer of the Naqshbandi Order in the sub-continent. His father Abd as-Salām Samarqandī was a scholar and saint from Kabul. His takhallus (pen name) was "Berang" (which literally means colorless or transparent).

Death
He died on 14 Jumada al-Thani 1012 AH (29 November 1603) and is buried in Delhi.

References

Hanafis
Maturidis
Naqshbandi order
Ziyarat
Dargahs in India
1564 births
1603 deaths